The Physician is a 1928 British silent drama film directed by Georg Jacoby and starring Miles Mander, Elga Brink and Ian Hunter. The film is based on a play by Henry Arthur Jones.

Plot
A former alcoholic tries to lead a crusade against drink, but is himself repeatedly tempted by alcohol.

Cast
Miles Mander as Walter Amphiel 
Elga Brink as Edana Hinde 
Ian Hunter as Dr. Carey 
Lissy Arna as Jessie Gurdon 
Humberston Wright as Stephen Gurdon 
Julie Suedo as Lady Valerie Camille 
Mary Brough as Landlady 
Henry Vibart as Reverend Peregrine Hinde 
Johnny Ashby as Jessie's Son

References

External links

British silent feature films
British drama films
Films shot at Lime Grove Studios
1928 drama films
Films directed by Georg Jacoby
British black-and-white films
1920s British films
Silent drama films